Michelle Berry is the author of three books of short stories, How to Get There from Here, Margaret Lives in the Basement, and I Still Don't Even Know You, as well as six novels, What We All Want, Blur, Blind Crescent, Interference, This Book Will Not Save Your Life and The Prisoner and the Chaplain. In October 2016, Berry opened a bookstore, The Hunter Street Bookstore, in Peterborough, Ontario. Berry closed the bricks-and-mortar store in June 2020, in part because of the pandemic, but rents space in Meta4 Contemporary Craft Gallery, and continues to operate an online ordering service.

Critical reception
The Globe and Mail reviewed Berry's 2011 novel This Book Will Not Save Your Life favorably, with reviewer Moira Dann called it a "a well-executed story that goes from quirky (intriguing off-centre family; blackly funny, even) to murky (unfettered, unrelenting dysfunction and despair, peopled by hard-to-like characters), while keeping the reader wondering what's going to happen next...The story is well-paced (even with the necessary repetition of its Rashomon-style narrative) and the characters are unforgettable."

Berry's 2014 novel Interference received mixed reviews. Writing in the National Post, Emily M. Keeler said, "Berry's better than most at weaving in and out of the perspectives of so many characters without losing steam; she manages her cast with considerable skill, and her approach makes it all the more enjoyable to piece together the goings on in fictional Parkville. Interference is like a short drive through a strange suburb, that rich domain of beautiful, frustrated youth and workaday adulthood; Berry's Parkville is a place many Canadians will recognize, but altered just slightly enough through her comic noir lens to let a little of the wit, and the fear, bleed out of the novel and into your head." By contrast in The Globe and Mail, reviewer Emily Donaldson suggested "Berry's characters are so thinly developed it's difficult to imagine them stripped of their banal problems."

Berry's sixth novel, The Prisoner and the Chaplain, was published in September 2017.  "The terror and disgust she works up in the novel's closing passages have staying power beyond the contrivances of its plot," asserts a review in Quill & Quire.

A new book, Everything Turns Away, is due out in September 2021.

References

Living people
Canadian booksellers
Canadian women short story writers
Canadian women novelists
21st-century Canadian short story writers
21st-century Canadian novelists
21st-century Canadian women writers
People from Peterborough, Ontario
Writers from Ontario
Year of birth missing (living people)